Pushpakala Thuraisingham (10 May 1973 – 10 August 1994; commonly known by the nom de guerre Captain Angayarkanni) was a Sri Lankan Tamil rebel and member of the Liberation Tigers of Tamil Eelam (LTTE), a separatist Tamil militant organisation in Sri Lanka. She was the LTTE's first female Black Tiger (suicide bomber). She sunk a Sri Lankan Navy Surveillance Command Centre Ship in a suicide attack in the sea near Kankesanthurai. Her death is significant as later females joined the Tamil Tigers at all levels and played significant roles (including the Black Tigers).

References 

1973 births
1994 suicides
Liberation Tigers of Tamil Eelam members
Female suicide bombers
People from Northern Province, Sri Lanka
People killed during the Sri Lankan Civil War
Sri Lankan Tamil rebels
Sri Lankan female criminals
Suicides in Sri Lanka